An aneurysm is a localized, blood-filled balloon-like bulge in the wall of a blood vessel.

Aneurysm may also refer to:
 Aneurysm (band), an Italian metal band
 "Aneurysm" (song), by American rock band Nirvana